Herbert Oglevee Morrison (May 14, 1905 – January 10, 1989) was an American radio journalist who recorded for broadcast his dramatic report of the Hindenburg disaster, a catastrophic fire that destroyed the LZ 129 Hindenburg zeppelin on May 6, 1937, killing 36 people.

Morrison was born in Connellsville, Pennsylvania on May 14, 1905, to Walter Lindsay Morrison and Bertha Frances Oglevee Morrison. Morrison's father left the family early and Morrison moved with his mother and older brother to Scottdale, Pennsylvania when he was a young boy.  The home he grew up in belonged to his grandmother, who supported the family by taking in boarders.

The Hindenburg disaster

Morrison and engineer Charlie Nehlsen had been assigned by station WLS in Chicago to cover the arrival of the Hindenburg in New Jersey for delayed broadcast.

Radio network policy in those days forbade the use of any other recorded material than that used for sound effects, and Morrison and Nehlsen had no facilities for live broadcast. Even so, the results still became the prototype for news broadcasting in the war years that followed. The event had no effect on this policy, and recordings were not regularly used until after the end of World War II.

Morrison's description began routinely, but changed instantly as the airship burst into flames:

Morrison and Nehlsen continued their work, reporting at length on the rescue efforts and interviewing survivors, with several pauses while Morrison composed himself. A small and dashing-looking man, Morrison wore a blue serge suit and a topcoat. Morrison mistakenly thought there were 106 people aboard the flight, when in reality there were 97 aboard. Thirty-five people died in addition to one fatality on the ground. The 16-inch green lacquer disk recordings were rushed back to Chicago by airplane and broadcast in full later that night. Portions were rebroadcast nationally by the NBC Radio network the next day. It was the first time that recordings of a news event were ever broadcast, and also the first coast-to-coast radio broadcast. Morrison's quick professional response and accurate description combined with his own emotional reaction have made the recordings a classic of audio history.

Several people believe that this classic recording is not an accurate reflection of Morrison's speech. These people theorize that Nehlsen's Presto 6D recorder ran about 3% slow, causing Morrison's voice to sound different from how it actually was, and that Morrison's normal speaking and radio announcer voice was actually quite deep as evidenced by other recordings of his voice from the same era.

One of these people is audio historian Michael Biel, formerly of Morehead State University, who studied the original recordings and analyzed Nehlsen's vital contribution as an engineer as well as the playback speed issue:

I have closely examined the original discs and photographed the grooves at the point of the explosion. You can see several deep digs in the lacquer before the groove disappears. Then almost immediately there is a faint groove for about two revolutions while Charlie Nehlsen gently lowered the cutting head back to the disc. Fortunately the cutting stylus never cut through the lacquer to the aluminum base. If that had happened the most dramatic part of the recording would not have been made because the stylus would have been ruined. The digs and the bouncing off of the cutting head were caused by the shock wave of the explosion which reached the machine just after Morrison said "It burst into flames..."

I and several others believe that the originals were recorded slightly slow, and that all replays have been at too fast a speed. Comparison with the now two other known contemporary recordings of Morrison demonstrate this conclusion.

Morrison's description has been dubbed onto the newsreel film of the crash, giving the impression of a modern television-style broadcast. However, at the time, newsreels were separately narrated in a studio, and Morrison's words were not heard in theaters.

The availability of newsreel films, photographs and Morrison's description was a result of heavy promotion of the arrival by the Zeppelin Company, making the crash a media event and raising its importance far beyond other disasters, less well-reported and documented.

Morrison's usual broadcast work was as an announcer on live musical programs, but his earlier successful reporting of Midwestern floods from an airplane led to his assignment at Lakehurst that day.

Morrison later served in the Army Air Forces during World War II and was the first news director at WTAE-TV, the ABC television affiliate in Pittsburgh. He also ran for Congress three times as a Pennsylvania Republican. Prior to retirement he served as a technical adviser for the 1975 film The Hindenburg and developed a  radio and television section at West Virginia University.

In popular culture

In the fourth episode of season 4 of The Simpsons, "Lisa the Beauty Queen", a Duff Beer blimp crashes into a broadcasting antenna and catches fire in a similar fashion to the Hindenburg. Kent Brockman exclaims "Oh the humanity!" upon seeing it.
In the fourth episode of Season 11 of Family Guy, "Yug Ylimaf", Brian Griffin takes a female he is dating into a time machine and goes back in time to the Hindenburg disaster. An alternate version of Morrison is then heard commenting on the disaster and of Brian and the woman making out next to the catastrophe, proclaiming "Oh the humanity!" on both counts.
In the pilot episode of Timeless, Morrison is portrayed by Donal Thoms-Cappello. He is shown narrating the arrival of the Hindenburg in both the original version of the landing and the alternate version of the landing which the time travelers diverge.
In season 8 episode 16 of Seinfeld, "The Pothole", Newman yells "Oh, the humanity" as his postal truck bursts into flames.
The event is also parodied in the WKRP in Cincinnati episode "Turkeys Away", with Les Nessman echoing some of Morrison's dramatic words.
In the 2000 film Dr. Seuss' How The Grinch Stole Christmas, the Grinch yells "Oh, the Who-manity!" when the Whoville Christmas tree burns to the ground.
In the 1988 film Heathers, the phrase "Oh, the humanity!" is used frequently as a reference. 
In the 1992 episode "Talk Show" of The Larry Sanders Show, Larry quotes "Oh the humanity" line from Morrison's report of the disaster, of which he also makes mention.
In the 2008 game Spore there is an achievement for destroying planet Earth called "Oh the Humanity!"
In Season 1, Episode 7 of Archer, "Skytanic", Archer yells "Oh, the humanity" when talking about the luxury airship Excelsior. A running gag throughout the episode is Archer thinking that the helium on the ship is volatile hydrogen.
In the 2016 video game Hearts of Iron IV, there is an event in which the Hindenburg crashes and the player's reaction is "Oh the Humanity!"
In the 1991 episode of Wings titled "The Tennis Bum", Joe Hackett uses the phrase "Oh, the humanity" after destroying the Graf Zeppelin model.
In the opening credits of the Dan Carlin podcast Hardcore History, a segment of the recording is used.
In Chapter 4 of the 2016 novel Dog Man by Dav Pilkey, Sarah Hatoff, the news reporter, yells "Oh, the caninity!" when an invention called "The Mutt-Masher 2000" is getting close to the ground while all of the dogs in the city are inside.
In Season 1 Episode 2 of Phineas and Ferb, “The Fast and the Phineas”, while Dr. Doofenshmirtz’s blimp hits the race car track broadcast tower, the announcer of the race yells, “Oh, the hu…” before the signal completely cuts out.

Footnotes

References
 "Herbert Morrison, Hindenburg Reporter." New York Times, January 11, 1989.
 "Herbert Morrison; Gave Report on Hindenburg." Chicago Tribune, January 11, 1989, page 13.
 "Herbert Morrison, Radio Reporter at Hindenburg Crash." Los Angeles Times, January 11, 1989, page 1-20.
 "Unforgettable Day." New York Times, May 5, 1985, page 58.

External links
 
 

 Morrison's recording
 Morrison's report (36:47) Real Audio
 Alternate (0:57) from Voices of the Twentieth Century
  (38:56) Original 78 RPM Vinyl
 Morrison's recording Corrected speed version at WLS History
 
 
 

 

American radio reporters and correspondents
American male journalists
American television news producers
Radio personalities from Chicago
Journalists from New York City
Journalists from West Virginia
Radio personalities from New York City
Radio personalities from Pittsburgh
People from Morgantown, West Virginia
United States Army personnel of World War II
United States Army Air Forces soldiers
LZ 129 Hindenburg
Pennsylvania Republicans
1905 births
1989 deaths
Television producers from New York City
Television producers from Pennsylvania
Television producers from West Virginia
Television producers from Illinois
20th-century American journalists